Echoes of a Friend is a 1972 album by jazz pianist McCoy Tyner released on the JVC label, and later on the Milestone label. It was recorded in Tokyo, Japan, on November 11, 1972, and features Tyner in a solo piano tribute to John Coltrane.

Reception
The AllMusic review by Scott Yanow states: "Few McCoy Tyner records are not easily recommended but this one even ranks above most."

Track listing
All compositions by McCoy Tyner except where noted.

 "Naima" (Coltrane) – 6:43  
 "Promise" (Coltrane) – 6:14  
 "My Favorite Things" (Hammerstein, Rodgers) – 8:44  
 "The Discovery" – 17:35  
 "Folks" – 7:33

Personnel 
 McCoy Tyner – piano

References 

Musical tributes
Albums produced by Orrin Keepnews
1972 albums
McCoy Tyner albums
Milestone Records albums